In topology and related areas of mathematics, a subspace of a topological space X is a subset S of X which is equipped with a topology induced from that of X called the subspace topology (or the relative topology, or the induced topology, or the trace topology).

Definition 

Subsets of topological spaces are usually assumed to be equipped with the subspace topology unless otherwise stated.

is continuous.

More generally, suppose   is an injection from a set  to a topological space .

Likewise it is called a closed subspace if the injection  is a closed map.

Terminology 

The distinction between a set and a topological space is often blurred notationally, for convenience, which can be a source of confusion when one first encounters these definitions.

Examples 
In the following,  represents the real numbers with their usual topology.
 The rational numbers  considered as a subspace of  do not have the discrete topology ({0} for example is not an open set in ). If a and b are rational, then the intervals (a, b) and [a, b] are respectively open and closed, but if a and b are irrational, then the set of all rational x with a < x < b is both open and closed.
 Let S = [0, 1) be a subspace of the real line .

Properties 

The subspace topology has the following characteristic property. Then for any topological space  a map  is continuous if and only if the composite map  is continuous. 

We list some further properties of the subspace topology.

 If  is continuous then  is continuous.
 The topology induced on a subset of a metric space by restricting the metric to this subset coincides with subspace topology for this subset.

Preservation of topological properties 

If a topological space having some topological property implies its subspaces have that property, then we say the property is hereditary. If only closed subspaces must share the property we call it weakly hereditary.

 Every open and every closed subspace of a completely metrizable space is completely metrizable.
 Every open subspace of a Baire space is a Baire space.
 Every closed subspace of a compact space is compact.
 Being a Hausdorff space is hereditary.
 Being a normal space is weakly hereditary.
 Total boundedness is hereditary.
 Being totally disconnected is hereditary.
 First countability and second countability are hereditary.

See also
 the dual notion quotient space 
 product topology
 direct sum topology

References 
 Bourbaki, Nicolas, Elements of Mathematics: General Topology, Addison-Wesley (1966)
 
 Willard, Stephen. General Topology, Dover Publications (2004) 

Topology
General topology